East Palatka is a census-designated place (CDP) in Putnam County, Florida, United States. It is located on the east side of the City of Palatka at the intersection of U.S. Route 17/State Road 20/State Road 100 and the southwestern terminus of State Road 207. The population was 1,654 at the 2010 census.

East Palatka is home to the Palatka State Farmer's Market, as well as the Putnam County Fairgrounds.

Geography

East Palatka is drained by the St. Johns River.

Demographics

As of the census of 2000, there were 1,707 people, 521 households, and 365 families residing in the CDP. The racial makeup of the CDP was 59.64% White, 37.26% African American, 0.29% Native American, 1.00% Asian, 0.76% from other races, and 1.05% from two or more races. Hispanic or Latino of any race were 2.40% of the population.

There were 521 households, out of which 28.6% had children under the age of 18 living with them, 50.5% were married couples living together, 15.5% had a female householder with no husband present, and 29.9% were non-families. 25.3% of all households were made up of individuals, and 12.7% had someone living alone who was 65 years of age or older.  The average household size was 2.50 and the average family size was 2.98.

In the CDP, the population was spread out, with 18.5% under the age of 18, 8.7% from 18 to 24, 36.7% from 25 to 44, 21.8% from 45 to 64, and 14.3% who were 65 years of age or older.  The median age was 38 years. For every 100 females, there were 158.2 males.  For every 100 females age 18 and over, there were 175.6 males.

The median income for a household in the CDP was $37,857, and the median income for a family was $46,071. Males had a median income of $31,507 versus $26,250 for females. The per capita income for the CDP was $18,478.  About 12.6% of families and 17.4% of the population were below the poverty line, including 41.4% of those under age 18 and 12.8% of those age 65 or over.

Residents 
The noted southern economist Dr. R. Christopher Jones was born and raised in East Palatka.

References

External links

 City of Palatka

Census-designated places in Putnam County, Florida
Census-designated places in Florida
Populated places on the St. Johns River